Anecdotes of Oyasama, the Foundress of Tenrikyo (稿本天理教教祖伝逸話篇 Kohon Tenrikyo Oyasama-den Itsuwa-hen) is an anthology of anecdotes about Nakayama Miki, the foundress of Tenrikyo. This text is one of the supplemental texts (準原典 jun-genten) to the Tenrikyo scriptures, along with The Doctrine of Tenrikyo and The Life of Oyasama.

Anecdotes of Oyasama was first published in the original Japanese on January 26, 1976, commemorating the 90th Anniversary of Oyasama (i.e. the 90th year since adherents believe Nakayama Miki withdrew from physical life and became everliving). An English translation was published the following year, on May 26, 1977.

The preface of the first 1956 publication of The Life of Oyasama mentions that a collection of anecdotes on Nakayama Miki would be put together in the near future. The "Kōki Committee," a subset of Tenrikyo reverends and scholars led by theologian Ueda Yoshinaru, compiled the anecdotes. The anecdotes were originally published in four volumes, each containing 50 stories. The first volume was released in January 1974, the second in September 1974, the third in May 1975, and the fourth in October 1975. The anecdotes went through further editing for content and wording before being published in one set of 200 stories on January 26, 1976.

References

Further reading
Ueda Y. (1976). Kōhon Tenrikyo Oyasama-den itsuwa-hen ni tsuite. [Regarding Anecdotes of Oyasama, Foundress of Tenrikyo] Michi no dai 65 (May 1976), pp. 26–43.

Tenrikyo